Josette Altmann Borbón (born February 17, 1958 San José, Costa Rica) is a Costa Rican historian, public figure and politician. She previously served as the First Lady of Costa Rica from 1994 to 1998 during the tenure of her ex-husband, former President José María Figueres. In June 2016, Altmann was elected Secretary General of the Latin American Social Sciences Institute (FLACSO), an inter-governmental organization dedicated to researching and teaching of the social sciences in Latin America and the Caribbean. She is the first woman to become Secretary General of FLACSO.

Biography 
Altmann Borbón holds a bachelor's degree in history and a master's degree in political science from the University of Costa Rica. She received her doctorate in humanities from Leiden University in the Netherlands.

She has served as a post-graduate professor at the University of Costa Rica's Department of Education and Social Sciences.

On June 3, 2016, Altmann was elected Secretary General of FLACSO. She will take office on July 31, 2016. Altmann had previously worked as a regional coordinator of international cooperation for FLACSO's General Secretariat from 2006 to 2012.

References

Living people
1958 births
First ladies and gentlemen of Costa Rica
Costa Rican historians
Costa Rican academics
Citizens' Action Party (Costa Rica) politicians
National Liberation Party (Costa Rica) politicians
Academic staff of the University of Costa Rica
Leiden University alumni
University of Costa Rica alumni
20th-century Costa Rican writers
21st-century Costa Rican writers
People from San José, Costa Rica